Gerard James Pertwee Horan (born 11 November 1962) is a British actor. He is known for playing Terry Seymour the leader of the DMC (Danebury Metal Detectoring Club) in the Bafta award-winning comedy drama Detectorists and for playing Firefighter Leslie "Charisma" Appleby in London's Burning from 1986 to 1989 and again in 1994.

Partial filmography

 My Beautiful Laundrette (1985) as Telephone Man
 The Singing Detective (1986, TV Mini-Series) as Reginald Dibbs
 London's Burning: The Movie (1986, TV Pilot Film) as Leslie 'Charisma' Appleby
 Hidden City (1987) as Young Man in Tunnel
 Sammy and Rosie Get Laid (1987) as Restaurant Manager
 London's Burning (1988-1989, 1994, TV Series) as Leslie 'Charisma' Appleby
 Tank Malling (1989) as Car Park Attendant
 Chicago Joe and the Showgirl (1990) as John Wilkins
 Lovejoy (1992, TV Series) as Toni
 The Ruth Rendell Mysteries (1991, TV Series) as John Hood
 Much Ado About Nothing (1993) as Borachio
 A Touch of Frost (1994, TV Series) as Ray Butler
 Mary Shelley's Frankenstein (1994) as Claude
 Immortal Beloved (1994) as Nikolaus Johann van Beethoven
 In the Bleak Midwinter (1995) as Carnforth Greville (Rosencrantz, Guildenstern, Horatio, and Barnardo)
 Different for Girls (1995) as Sergeant Harry
 Les Misérables (1998) as Digne Gendarme
 Wycliffe (1998, TV Series) as DS Chaplin
 Harbour Lights as Tony Simpson
 Hot Money (2001, TV Movie) as Don Watmore
 The Last Great Wilderness (2002) as Contract killer
 Nicholas Nickleby (2002) as Ned Cheeryble
 Dr Jekyll and Mr Hyde (2002) as Utterson
 Bright Young Things (2003) as Race Official
 My Family (2004, TV Series) as Mr. Addiss
 Imagine Me & You (2005) as Trevor
 Oliver Twist (2005) as Farmer
 Doc Martin (2005, TV Series) as Eddie Rix
 As You Like It (2006) as Denis
 Dalziel and Pascoe episode "Guardian Angel" as Jim Webster
 Doctor Who (2007, Episodes: "Human Nature" and "The Family of Blood") as Mr Clark / Father of Mine
 Kingdom (2007-2009, TV Series) as DC Yelland
 Lark Rise to Candleford (2008, TV Series) as Mr Paxton
 The Bank Job (2008) as Det. Sgt. Roy Given
 Lewis (2010) as DC Hooper 
 Appropriate Adult (2011, TV Mini-Series) as Howard Ogden
 My Week with Marilyn (2011) as Trevor
 DCI Banks (2011) as Les Holt
 Gambit (2012) as Mr. Knowles
 WPC 56 (2013) as Desk Sergeant Peter Pratt
 Midsomer Murders (2014, TV Series) as Ewan Evans
 Walter (2014, TV Movie) as D.S. Geoffrey Pollard
 Da Vinci's Demons (2014-2015, TV Series) as Rodrigo
 Detectorists (2014-2017, TV Series) as Terry Seymour
 Cinderella (2015) as Lord Veneering
 Beauty and the Beast (2017) as Monsieur Jean Potts
 Murder on the Orient Express (2017) as Aynesworth
 All Is True (2018) as Ben Jonson
 Artemis Fowl (2020) as Doctor Po
 Belfast (2021) as Mackie
 Allelujah (2022) as Mr. Earnshaw

Partial Stage
 Jerusalem (2009 and 2022) as Wesley
 The Vote (2015) as Alan
 The Ferryman (2017) as Father Horrigan
 The Nativity at the NT.

External links
 

1962 births
Living people
20th-century English male actors
21st-century English male actors
Actors from Stockport
Alumni of RADA
English male film actors
English male Shakespearean actors
English male stage actors
English male television actors